The Maltings College is a free school sixth form in Fountainhead, near Halifax, West Yorkshire, England.

Established in 2013, The Maltings College is located at the former site of Webster's Brewery. Until its closure in 2018, the college offers a range of vocational qualifications at levels 1 to 3. Areas of instruction include:

Barbering
Beauty Therapy
Business
Catering
Childcare
Hairdressing
Health and Social Care
IT Networking
Motor Vehicle Maintenance
Sport

References

External links
The Maltings College official website

Free schools in Yorkshire
Educational institutions established in 2013
2013 establishments in England
Education in Calderdale
Schools in Halifax, West Yorkshire